Gabriel Chen-Ying Ly (李振英; Hanyu pinyin: Li Zhenying; 4 October 1929 – 18 February 2023) was a Taiwanese philosopher, secretary-general of the Chinese Regional Bishops' Conference and president of Fu Jen Catholic University.

Ly was a philosophy professor at Fu Jen and the National Chengchi University.

Ly died on 18 February 2023, at the age of 93.

References

External links
 輔大校史室：李振英
 輔大哲學系：李振英

1929 births
2023 deaths
Educators from Tianjin
Pontifical Urban University alumni
Presidents of universities and colleges in Taiwan
Academic staff of Fu Jen Catholic University
Taiwanese educators